Homay-e Olya (also Romanized as Homāy-e ‘Olyā; also known as Homāy Bālā, Homā-ye Bālā, Homāy-e Bālā, Homā-ye ‘Olyā, Umai, Ūmay, and Umay-Yukhari) is a village in Sina Rural District, in the Central District of Varzaqan County, East Azerbaijan Province, Iran. At the 2006 census, its population was 118, in 23 families.

References 

Towns and villages in Varzaqan County